Keenan is an unincorporated community in Clinton Township, Saint Louis County, Minnesota, United States.

Geography
The community is located 9 miles southwest of the city of Eveleth, near the intersection of Saint Louis County Highway 7 and County Road 310 (Keenan Road).

Elbow Creek flows through the community. Iron Junction and the community of Forbes are both nearby.

History
The community bears the name of C. J. Keenan, a railroad agent.

References

Unincorporated communities in Minnesota
Unincorporated communities in St. Louis County, Minnesota